Tiyeglow District is a district of the southwestern Bakool region of Somalia. Its capital is Tiyeglow.

References

External links
 Districts of Somalia
 Administrative map of Tiyeglow District

Districts of Somalia

Bakool